Sebastian Bergne (born 1966) British Industrial Designer who is known for making everyday objects special with his essential and human approach to design. He has described the practice of design as “[t]he meeting point between the arts and hardcore engineering sciences.”

Bergne and his team work as an external design consultancy for international brands, as a designer and supplier of bespoke objects for restaurants, retailers, and individuals, and as a producer of a growing collection of personal editions. His wealth of experience makes him sought after as a curator, lecturer and commentator on design.

Early life an education 
Bergne is the son of Paul Bergne, a British diplomat and Suzanne Bergne, a ceramist/psychotherapist. He is the grandson of writer Diana Holman-Hunt and second great grandson of Pre-Raphaelite painter William Holman Hunt.

Bergne was educated at Bedales School. Then at the Central School of Art and Design where he received a Bachelor's degree in Industrial Design (Eng) in 1988 and then an MDes with distinction in Industrial Design from The Royal College of Art, London in 1990. He set up his commercial studio in London in the same year followed by a second in Bologna, Italy, between 2000 and 2007.

He has spoken about how childhood dyslexia influenced his education and career choices.

Professional background 
Bergne has worked with a wide variety of clients including Authentics, DeBeers LV, Driade, ENO, Epson, Lexon, Moulinex, Muji, P&G, Sassoon, Swarovski, Tefal, Vitra and WMF. His work has been widely published, exhibited and included in permanent collections including that of the Museum of Modern Art in New York (MoMA), the Design Museum in London, and Museé des Arts Décoratifs in Paris. He has also been honoured with numerous international design awards such as Red Dot, Design Plus and iF Product Design Award.

Bergne shares his knowledge and experience as a jury member, lecturer, and by contributing to graduate and postgraduate design education at The Royal College of Art, ECAL, Central School of Art and Design, and the University of Venice.

Publications 

100 Contemporary Green Buildings by Philip Jodidio, Taschen, 2013. 
 Design In Britain, Edited by Deyan Sujic, Conran Octopus Ltd, 2009. 
 Designing The 21st Century, Edited by Charlotte and Peter Fiell, Taschen, 2001. 
 SPOON, Edited by Emilia Terragni, Phaidon Press Ltd, 2002. 
 Designers On Design, Terence Conran and Max Fraser, Conran Octopus Ltd, 2004.

References

External links 
 http://sebastianbergne.com
 https://vimeo.com/59896456
 http://designmuseum.org/design/sebastian-bergne
 https://web.archive.org/web/20090909233830/http://php.unirsm.sm/mediateca/web/conferenze.php?id=3
 http://www.designcity.lu/2012/05/talks-to-turn-you-on/
 http://www.moma.org/interactives/exhibitions/1995/mutantmaterials/metals.html
 http://www.moma.org/interactives/exhibitions/2001/workspheres/
 http://www.somersethouse.org.uk/visual_arts/1245.asp
 https://web.archive.org/web/20110309090008/http://www.londondesignguide.com/2010/06/exhibition-blow-by-blow-at-somerset-house/
 Cru by Sebastian Bergne
 Sebastian Bergne, Design Dialogues

1966 births
Living people
Alumni of the Central School of Art and Design
Alumni of the Royal College of Art
British industrial designers
British furniture designers
British designers
Industrial design
Designers
People with dyslexia